Brezniţa may refer to one of two communes in Mehedinți County, Romania:

Breznița-Ocol
Breznița-Motru

See also
Breznica (disambiguation)
Březnice (disambiguation)